Tobi 24 - Coptic Calendar - Tobi 26

The twenty-fifth day of the Coptic month of Tobi, the fifth month of the Coptic year. On a common year, this day corresponds to January 20, of the Julian Calendar, and February 2, of the Gregorian Calendar. This day falls in the Coptic Season of Shemu, the season of the Harvest.

Commemorations

Saints 

 The martyrdom of Saint Askala 
 The departure of Saint Peter of Scetis, the Worshiper

References 

Days of the Coptic calendar